The 1938 Wisconsin gubernatorial election was held on November 8, 1938.

Incumbent Progressive Governor Philip La Follette was defeated by Republican nominee Julius P. Heil.

Primary elections
Primary elections were held on September 20, 1938.

Democratic primary

Candidates
Jerome F. Fox, former member of the Wisconsin State Assembly
Robert Kirkland Henry, former Wisconsin State Treasurer
Edward Ihlenfeldt, unsuccessful candidate for Democratic nomination for Secretary of State of Wisconsin in 1934

Results

Henry, former Democratic State Treasurer, stood for both the Democratic and Republican nominations as part of a coalition movement designed to defeat Philip La Follette and the Progressive Party. If he had won both nominations, he intended to decline the nomination of the party in whose primary he received fewest votes.

Henry won the Democratic nomination but lost the Republican nomination to Julius P. Heil. On October 1, 1938, Henry withdrew from the election in favour of Heil. On October 7, 1938, the Democratic state central committee met and nominated State Senator Harry W. Bolens to replace Henry on the Democratic ticket.

Republican primary

Candidates
Julius P. Heil, industrialist
Robert Kirkland Henry, former Wisconsin State Treasurer
Clun L. Miller, insurance counsellor
James G. Peterson, farmer

Results

Progressive primary

Candidates
Philip La Follette, incumbent Governor
Glenn P. Turner, Socialist nominee for Attorney General of Wisconsin in 1930 and 1934

Results

Union primary

Candidates
Frank W. Smith

Results

General election

Candidates
Major party candidates
Harry W. Bolens, Democratic
Julius P. Heil, Republican
Philip La Follette, Progressive

Other candidates
John Schleier, Jr., Independent Socialist Labor
Frank W. Smith, Union

Results

References

Bibliography
 
 

1938
Wisconsin
Gubernatorial
November 1938 events